Tiran and Karvan County is in Isfahan province, Iran. The capital of the county is the city of Tiran. At the 2006 census, the county's population was 64,043 in 17,802 households. The following census in 2011 counted 69,047 people in 21,031 households. At the 2016 census, the county's population was 71,575 in 22,704 households.

Administrative divisions

The population history of Tiran and Karvan County's administrative divisions over three consecutive censuses is shown in the following table. The latest census shows two districts, four rural districts, and three cities.

References

 

Counties of Isfahan Province